The Duel  is a 1910 Russian short film directed by Maurice Maître.

Plot 
The film is based on the 1905 novel The Duel by Aleksandr Kuprin.

Lieutenant Romashov falls in love with his captain's young wife Alexandra Nikolaeva.

History 
The premiere took place on September 28, 1910. The film has been preserved to our time without inscriptions.

Cast
 A. Lesnogorsky as Romashov
 Z. Mamonova as Shurochka
 Nikolay Vailiev as Nikolaev
 Lidiya Sycheva
 Nikolai Vekov

Film crew 
Directed by: André Maitre

Screenplay: Vladimir Konenko

Cinematography: Georges Meyer, Toppi

Production designer: Czeslaw Sabinski

Literature
 Great Cinema. Catalog of Surviving Feature Films of Russia. 1908 — 1919; New Literary Review Publishing, 2002. Page  66.

See also 
 Duel (1957 film)

References 

1910 films
1910 drama films
1910 short films
1910s Russian-language films
Adaptations of works by Aleksandr Kuprin
Russian black-and-white films
Russian silent short films
Russian drama films
Films of the Russian Empire
Films about duels
Silent drama films